ACMI, formerly the Australian Centre for the Moving Image, is Australia's national museum of film, television, videogames, and art. ACMI was established in 2002 and is based at Federation Square in Melbourne, Victoria.

During the 2014-15 financial year, 1.3 million people visited ACMI, the second-highest attendance of any gallery or museum in Australia. In May 2019, ACMI closed to the public to begin a $40 million redevelopment. It reopened in February 2021.

History

Beginnings in the State Film Centre of Victoria
Prior to ACMI, Victoria's main film and screen organisation was the State Film Centre of Victoria, based at Treasury Theatre, which was established in 1946.

In the 1950s, the State Film Centre was involved in producing a number of projects for television, then a new medium in Australia. It also played a role as an archive of Australian films, such as The Sentimental Bloke (1919) and On Our Selection (1920).

During the 1960s, the State Film Centre provided advice on film treatments, production, scripts and distribution outlets to local filmmakers. In 1969, the centre assumed management of the newly constructed State Film Theatre, providing a facility for exhibiting material not screened in commercial cinemas.

In the 1970s, the centre began acquiring examples of student films as well as those made by the newly vibrant Australian film industry, such as Homesdale (1971) by Peter Weir, Stork (1971) and Alvin Purple (1973) by Tim Burstall, and The Devil's Playground (1976) by Fred Schepisi.

In 1988, the State Film Centre Education Program was set up. The program provided screenings for Victorian Certificate of Education students, based on core texts, and in-service days for their teachers.

Establishing ACMI at Federation Square 
In 1993, a Victorian state government report reaffirmed the viability of a proposal for an Australian Centre for the Moving Image. In July 1997, following an open, international and two-stage design competition, Lab Architecture Studio (based in London at the time), in association with their joint venture partners, Bates Smart architects, was announced as the winner. Federation Square was to be a new civic space, built above the Jolimont railyards, to mark the celebration of Australia's Centenary of Federation.

On 1 January 2002, the Australian Centre for the Moving Image was officially established by the Film Act 2001 (Victoria). The first stage was opened in October, with two exhibitions, Deep Space: Sensation & Immersion and Ngarinyin Pathways Dulwan, running in ACMI's Screen Gallery. A few weeks later, ACMI Cinemas officially opened.

In September 2009, the Australian Mediatheque and the Screen Worlds gallery opened. The Screen Worlds exhibition was opened by Cate Blanchett, who loaned her Oscar for best supporting actress for her part as Katharine Hepburn in The Aviator. Screen Worlds: The Story of Film, Television and Digital Culture is a free and permanent exhibition space constructed to educate the public about the moving image, a museum about moving pictures. The Mediatheque is a partnership with the National Film and Sound Archive (NFSA), which provides a space with 12 viewing booths where people can drop in and watch films, television clips, and new media and artworks from the NFSA and ACMI collections.

Directors
From 1992, John J. Smithies was Director of the State Film Centre of Victoria, until its merger with Film Victoria in 1997 formed Cinemedia. At Cinemedia, Smithies was Deputy Director, with prime responsibility for developing the Australian Centre for the Moving Image. He became the first director and CEO of ACMI in March 2002. He was responsible for opening the new public facilities in October 2002. After a period of turmoil, with the organisation over budget, Smithies left ACMI in 2004, and later said the facility had been forced to open while "under-funded" by the  Victorian Government.

Tony Sweeney was appointed director and CEO of ACMI in 2005. Before his move to Australia, he had been the Deputy Director of the National Museum of Photography, Film & Television (UK), and focused on developing the Museum's brand profile and content strategies. He directed the Museum's Imaging Frontiers masterplan re-development, which generated record visitor numbers and international critical acclaim. The Museum is now seen as one of the leading international centres for culture and learning of its kind in the world. At ACMI he oversaw record organisational growth, performance and visitation, and a prolonged period of sustained success and achievement. Having spent ten years in the role, Sweeney resigned in order to return to his family in Britain.

Katrina Sedgwick took up the position in February 2015.

Attractions

Gallery 1
The screen gallery, renamed Gallery 1 when Gallery 2 was introduced in 2009, was built along the entire length of what was previously Princes Bridge railway station. It is a subterranean gallery for experimentation with the moving image. Video art, installations, interactive, sound art, net art and screen related objects are all regularly exhibited in this space.

Gallery 1 exhibitions
With the exception of a dance work that formed part of the Melbourne International Arts Festival, Gallery 1 is usually either hosting an exhibition, or installing the next one. The exhibitions alternate between in-house and touring, and between free and ticketed.

Gallery 2
Open from 18 September 2009, Gallery 2 is a smaller, more flexible gallery than Gallery 1.

Cinemas
ACMI has two main cinemas that are equipped to play every film, video and digital video format, with the most extensive projection facilities in the southern hemisphere. THX certified sound systems allow high quality attention to acoustics. Cinema 1 seats 168, and Cinema 2 seats 390.

Programs
ACMI's weekly and monthly film programs include:
Australian Perspectives – Contemporary Australian filmmaking with archival classics and special guest presentations.
Matinees – Ongoing program of quality films.
Family films – Regular screenings and school holiday programs of movies for families.
Cinémathèque – Double feature every Wednesday night of rare and imported prints.

ACMI also regularly profiles actors, directors, writers, cinematographers, and film genres through its retrospective seasons and screenings. Highlights have included seasons on Serge Gainsbourg, Dario Argento, William Klein, Xavier Dolan, John Cassavetes, Claudia Cardinale and Jim Henson. Genres have included Ozploitation, East German Cinema,  Monsters, Ghouls and Melancholy Misfits in conjunction with the Tim Burton exhibition.

ACMI undertakes partnerships with a variety of Film Festivals; Melbourne International Film Festival, Melbourne Queer Film Festival, Korean Film Festival, the Human Rights Arts and Film Festival, Little Big Shots, the Melbourne International Animation Festival and more.

In ACMI's Studios, Public Programs take place, such as A Moon Safari by Steam Bicycle and Kaleidoscope! Kids Animation.

Studio 1
Studio 1 is a production and educational amphitheatre which can accommodate everything from multimedia performances to television broadcasts, and is equipped with video projection, video conferencing, web casting and online facilities.

Studio 2
ACMI also houses a digital studio for hands-on workshops and production programs. Participants can access the technology, and develop the skills, to produce their own moving image work.

ACMI Shop
The ACMI Shop, located on the entry level next to the Tickets & Information Desk, stocks exhibition catalogues, books, DVDs, toys, cards and gifts.

ACMI X
ACMI X is a 2,000sqm office space that brings curators, programmers, producers and administrators together in a 60-seat co-working space dedicated to the creative industries.

Former attractions

Screen Worlds
Open from 18 September 2009, Screen Worlds was an evolving permanent exhibition exploring all aspects of the moving image using objects, footage and artistic installations. Screen Worlds explored the story of the moving image through a number of different sections – Emergence, Voices, Sensation, Games Lab and Kids Space.

The Screen Worlds exhibition hosted a number of 'Immersive Experiences'(interactive displays), including Timeslice (inspired by The Matrix), Ty the Tasmanian Tiger Zoetrope, The Faulty Fandangle (created by Oscar®-nominated Anthony Lucas), an installation by Anthony McCall, and many more.

Screen Worlds closed on  April 22, 2019 to allow for redevelopment.

Video Garden
The Video Garden was an outdoor gallery that led people from the Flinders Street side of the building to the main entrance. Exhibitions included Random Encounters, Gooey by the Lycette Bros, and Blast Off.

Memory Grid
The Memory Grid was a display allowing access to over 100 hours of film that were recorded by ordinary Australians, independent filmmakers, students, community-based practitioners and participants in ACMI hands-on production workshops. Much of the content in the Memory Grid had either never been displayed outside, or had been displayed only once on community television. Further, the Memory Grid contained a large collection of animated and interactive works, and actively accepted work from the public for display.

Australian Mediatheque
Australian Mediatheque, coordinated by ACMI and the National Film and Sound Archive (NFSA) was a multiple screen station with access to works from ACMI and the NFSA. Admission was free. The Australian Mediatheque closed permanently in September 2017.

Screen It
Screen It  is a yearly competition for primary and secondary school students with a love of filmmaking hosted by ACMI. Screen It has 6 categories: Primary Live Action, Primary Animation, Primary Videogame, Secondary Live Action, Secondary Animation and Secondary Videogame. Each year there is a theme the films must be based on, past themes including Change (2015) and Reflection (2014). Usually around November or December there is a Red Carpet Awards Gala for the finalists in which they announce winners and the next year's theme. The competition was cancelled after 2019's event, with ACMI citing a "[transformation] into a brand new global museum".

Games Lab
The Games Lab was ACMI's display area for interactive video games. It celebrated the past, present and future of games and promoted this popular form of the moving image as a reflection of Australian culture.

In 2003, ACMI commissioned an interactive game-based, site specific installation called AcmiPark, which was exhibited in the Games Lab. AcmiPark replicates and abstracts the real world architecture of Federation Square. It also houses highly innovative mechanisms for interactive, multiplayer sound and musical composition.

The Games Lab exhibited the Best of the Independent Games Festival for 2005, 2006 and 2007. In early 2007, Hits of the 80s profiled Melbourne's Beam Software and the secret history of Australia's place in the rise and rise of the video game. In 2005 an exhibition was dedicated to Sonic the Hedgehog called Sonic the Hedgehog: Icon of our Times.

The Games Lab was incorporated into the Screen Worlds exhibition space.

Online
ACMI has a strong online presence, with regular updates being made to the ACMI website and a dedicated section for blogs, podcasts, videos and news. ACMI also has a number of online projects which encourage user-generated content. These sites include 15 Second Place, Generator and the Educators Lounge.

Touring
ACMI have increased their touring program over the past few years. Beginning with Mary and Max, which toured regional Victoria, ACMI then followed by showing the 2011 Best of the Independent Games Festival  in Sydney and Brisbane. Shaun Tan's The Lost Thing: From Book To Film and War Pictures: Australians at the Cinema 1914–1918. ACMI's first original exhibition in the Melbourne Winter Masterpieces series, Game Masters: The Exhibition.

Game Masters: The Exhibition

Touring Venues To Date:

Museum of New Zealand Te Papa Tongarewa, Wellington, New Zealand 
15 Dec 2012 – 28 April 2013

Powerhouse Museum, Sydney, Australia
13 Dec 2013 – 25 May 2014

National Museum of Scotland, Edinburgh, Scotland 
5 Dec 2014 – 20 April 2015

Halmstad Arena, Sweden 
28 May – 31 Aug 2015

Oregon Museum of Science and Industry, Portland, USA 
13 Feb – 8 May 2016

Center of Science and Industry, Columbus, USA 
11 June – 5 Sept 2016

Museum für Kunst und Gewerbe, Hamburg, Germany 
14 Nov 2016 – 23 April 2017

Fleet Science Center, San Diego, USA 
01 Jul 2017 – 18 Jan 2018

The Franklin Institute, Philadelphia, USA 
31 Mar – 03 Sept 2018 

Science Museum of Minnesota, St Paul, USA
15 Feb 2019 – 5 May 2019

National Film and Sound Archive, Canberra, Australia
27 September 2019 – 9 March 2020

DreamWorks Animation: The Exhibition - Journey from sketch to screen, which includes over 400 works of art, including original hand-drawn character sketches, 3D marquettes of locations and characters, storyboards, interactive displays that allow you to play with DreamWorks animation technology, and a 180 degree film display that takes viewers on a journey from script pages and drawings through to a fully rendered 3D world.

Touring Venues To Date:

ArtScience Museum, Singapore 
13 June – 27 Sept 2015

Te Papa, New Zealand 
12 Dec 2015 – 28 Mar 2016

Seoul Museum of Art, Seoul, South Korea
30 April – 15 Aug 2016

National Taiwan Science and Education Centre, Taipei, Taiwan
29 Oct 2016 – 5 Feb 2017

Museo de Arte Contemporáneo de Monterrey, Monterrey, Mexico
6 Apr – 6 Aug 2017

Canadian Museum of History, Ottawa, Canada 
7 Dec 2017 – 08 Apr 2018

Montreal Science Centre, Montreal, Canada
9 May – 16 Sept 2018

Centro Cultural Banco do Brasil, Rio de Janeiro, Brazil 
5 Feb – 15 Apr 2019

Centro Cultural Banco do Brasil, Belo Horizonte, Brazil 
14 May – 29 Jul 2019

National Museum of Australia, Canberra, Australia 
12 September 2019 – 2 February 2020

Northwest Museum of Art and Culture, Spokane, USA
26 Mar – 05 Sep 2022

Del Kathryn Barton: The Nightingale and the Rose

Showcasing the hauntingly beautiful collaboration between two-time Archibald Prize winner Del Kathryn Barton and acclaimed filmmaker Brendan Fletcher, this milestone exhibition traces the compelling interpretation of Oscar Wilde's 19th century classic through a sophisticated and nuanced artistic lens.

Featuring a selection of Barton's evocative artworks alongside a screening of the film, stunning never-before-seen handmade props, and material from the production archives, Del Kathryn Barton: The Nightingale and the Rose reveals the extraordinary workings behind this captivating animated picture.

Touring venues:

Swan Hill Regional Gallery, VIC
1 Dec 2017 – 28 Jan 2018

Cairns Art Gallery, QLD
16 Feb 2018 – 22 Apr 2018

Rockhampton Art Gallery, QLD
16 Jun – 05 Aug 2018

Horsham Regional Art Gallery, VIC
18 Aug – 07 Oct 2018

Yarra Ranges Regional Museum, VIC
20 Oct 2018 – 3 Feb 2019

Devonport Regional Gallery, TAS
16 Mar – 5 May 2019

Maitland Regional Art Gallery, NSW
27 Jul – 3 Nov 2019

Wagga Wagga Art Gallery, NSW
16 Nov 2019 – 26 Jan 2020

New England Regional Art Gallery, NSW
7 Feb – 3 May 2020

Code Breakers: Women in Games

the first Australian exhibition celebrating the achievements of women working in the games industry. Whether it's making commercial hits or indie titles, these women know games, contributing as directors, programmers, developers, artists, writers, producers and designers. Inside the exhibition you can play everything from platformers, RPGs and digital board games to graphical adventures and puzzlers, there's something for everyone, at every skill level.

Alongside the fun, Code Breakers ponders important questions in the post-Gamergate landscape: How do women carve a path in an industry that has historically been hostile towards them? How do we encourage diversity? What does a more inclusive games industry look like? Each maker reflects on the sometimes challenging journey they've made in this male-dominated industry, revealing the human stories behind their games.

Touring venues:

Manningham Art Gallery, VIC
4 April – 12 May 2018

Warrnambool Art Gallery, VIC
21 July – 14 Oct 2018

Latrobe Regional Gallery, VIC
27 Oct 2018 – 27 Jan 2019

Swan Hill Regional Gallery, VIC
8 Feb – 24 Mar 2019

East Gippsland Art Gallery, VIC
4 April – 19 May 2019

Discovery Science and Technology Centre, Bendigo VIC
10 Oct 2019 – 13 Apr 2020

Orange Regional Gallery, NSW
25 Jul – 14 Oct 2020

The Workshops Rail Museum, Ipswich, QLD
24 Oct 2020 – 2 May 2021

Cobb+Co Museum, Toowoomba, QLD
8 May – 8 Aug 2021

Yarra Ranges Regional Museum, Lilydale, VIC
5 March– 15 May 2022

OTAGO Museum, Dunedin, New Zealand
2 July –30 Oct 2022

Cleverman

Conceived and developed in close consultation with a multidisciplinary Indigenous Advisory Group, led by ACMI’s First Nations curator Kathrine Clarke, a proud Wotjobaluk woman from the Wimmera,  and co-curated by Cleverman concept creator Ryan Griffen and Cleverman production designer Jacob Nash, Cleverman: The Exhibition premiered at ACMI in December 2018.

Cleverman: The Exhibition  celebrates the groundbreaking Australian Indigenous superhero television series Cleverman using props, original sketches and rich audio and video content to provide unique insights into how this incredible series was made.

The exhibition explores First Nations storytelling, language and creativity, and invites visitors to listen-first and immerse themselves in a powerful and contemporary expression of Indigenous origin stories.

Visitors are welcomed into the Bindawu Spirit listening space to hear the key Dreaming stories that underpin Cleverman. They can explore original props, costumes and character designs by Peter Jackson's WETA Workshop, interviews with the cast and crew and original artwork from the comic book.

Touring venues:

The Riddoch & Main Corner Complex, Mount Gambier, SA
14 Mar – 6 September 2020

Caboolture Regional Art Gallery, Moreton Bay, QLD
25 Sept – 6 Dec 2020

Yarrawarra Aboriginal Cultural Centre, Corindi, NSW
19 Dec 2020 – 11 Apr 2021

Gosford Regional Gallery, Gosford, NSW
22 May – 11 Jul 2021

Orange Regional Museum, Orange, NSW
24 Jul – 24 Oct 2021

Murray Bridge Regional Gallery, Murray Bridge, SA
11 Dec 2021 – 30 Jan 2022

Museum of the Riverina, Wagga Wagga, NSW
5 Mar – 29 May 2022

Museum of the Great Southern, Albany, WA
12 Jun – 09 Oct 2022

References

External links
 
 Australian Centre for the Moving Image at Google Cultural Institute
 Culture Victoria – Video and a brief history of ACMI

Museums in Melbourne
Cartooning museums
Cinema museums
History of film
History of television in Australia
Media museums
Museums in popular culture
Photographic technology museums
Photo archives in Australia
Buildings and structures in Melbourne City Centre
2002 establishments in Australia